Vellore riots of 1930–1931 are a series of communal riots between Hindus and Muslims in 1930–1931.

Events 

The first of the communal riots broke out on 8 June 1930 originating in a clash between a group of Muslims leading a Muharram procession past a Hindu temple and Hindu worshippers at the temple. The reason for the outbreak was claimed to be an offensive gesture towards the Hindu deity at the temple by a member of the procession. The riot was followed by a minor clash between Christians and Muslims in Udayandiram in North Arcot. There were fears of a riot in Madras city and security was tightened all over the Madras Presidency.

In 1931, a second communal riot broke out in Vellore. This originated in a clash between a procession of members of the Indian National Congress and a Muslim procession in celebration of Milad-un-Nabi. The house of Muslim leader, Janab Abdul Jabbar, who is alleged to have instigated the rioters, was set on fire by a mob of over 200 Hindus but was, however, saved from destruction. A third riot broke out in August 1931 during a Hindu festival.

References 

 

Riots and civil disorder in India
Vellore district
Social history of Tamil Nadu
1930 in India
Crime in Tamil Nadu
1931 in India
1930 riots
1931 riots
June 1930 events
August 1931 events